Omutinsky (masculine), Omutinksaya (feminine), or Omutinskoye (neuter) may refer to:
Omutinsky District, a district of Tyumen Oblast, Russia
Omutinskaya, a rural locality (a village) in Arkhangelsk Oblast, Russia
Omutinskoye, a rural locality (a selo) in Tyumen Oblast, Russia